Apparicine is a monoterpenoid indole alkaloid. It is named after Apparicio Duarte, a Brazilian botanist who studied the Aspidosperma species from which apparicine was first isolated. It was the first member of the vallesamine group of alkaloids to be isolated and have its structure established, which was first published in 1965. It has also been known by the synonyms gomezine, pericalline, and tabernoschizine.

Biochemistry 
The alkaloid has been isolated from seven species of Aspidosperma. It is the principal alkaloid found in the callus of Tabernaemontana elegans, and has also been identified in other  Tabernaemontana species, including T. africana, T. divaricata, T. orientalis, and T. pachysiphon.  In studies of T. pachysiphon, it was found that alkaloid content including that of apparicine was greatest in young leaves and leaves receiving greater shade, and varied with leaf age, plant age, and provenance.

Research on Aspidosperma pyricollum has led to the discovery that apparicine is biosynthesised from tryptophan by "loss of C-2 and retention of C-3". The biosynthesis of apparicine requires alteration of the usual tryptamine side chain with loss of C-1.

Structure determination 
Its structure was established through the methods of chemical decomposition, and the nascent field of nuclear magnetic resonance (NMR) decoupling using the 1H isotope of hydrogen. Ultraviolet–visible spectroscopy showed that apparicine has a similar UV absorption to uleine, and their chromophores were found to be identical.

NMR decoupling experiments revealed that apparicine lacks an N-methyl signal and has one methylenic carbon atom between the nitrogen atom and the indole rings, allowing researchers to distinguish it from uleine. This was a notable early use of NMR decoupling to determine a chemical structure. Its carbon skeleton was found to be related but different from that of uleine, and the structures of vallesamine and O-acetyl-vallesamine to be related to apparicine.

Dehydrogenation of apparicine followed by oxidation with permanganate allowed location of the two piperidine ring carbon substituents.

Applications 

Apparicine may have several potential applications. In cell cultures, it has shown cytotoxicity against the experimental lymphocytic leukemia P388 cell line. It exhibits strong activity against poliovirus type 3 (PV3), and has moderate to strong activity against some human pathogens. It is also active at opioid receptors and has micromolar affinity for adenosine receptors. Apparicine has local analgesic properties. It inhibited xanthine oxidase as potently as allopurinol (IC50 = 0.65 μM).

See also 
Catharanthine
Pericine
Tabernaemontanine

Notes

References

External links 
(-)-Apparicine at the United States Environmental Protection Agency
(-)-Apparicine at KNApSAck
Pericalline at ChemIDplus

Indole alkaloids
Vinylidene compounds